The 2020–21 Men's Belgian Hockey League was the 101st season of the Men's Belgian Hockey League, the top men's Belgian field hockey league. The season began on 11 September 2020 and ended on 9 May 2021 with the second match of the championship final in Antwerp.

Dragons won their 12th title by defeating the Waterloo Ducks 4–3 and 2–1 in the final series. The defending champions Léopold, finished in third place.

Teams

Number of teams by provinces

Regular season

Standings

Results

Play-downs
The points obtained during the regular season were halved before the start of the play-downs. As a result, the teams started with the following points before the play-downs: Herakles 8 points, Braxgata 7, Antwerp 5, Daring 5, Namur 2 and Old Club 0.

Play-offs
The points obtained during the regular season were halved before the start of the play-offs and the teams were put into two pools. As a result, the teams in pool A started with the following points before the play-offs: Gantoise 18.5 points, Léopold 13, Dragons 11.5 and Racing 9 and in pool B: Waterloo Ducks 16 points, Orée 15, Leuven 11 and Beerschot 10.

Pool A

Pool B

Classification matches

Seventh place game

Fifth place game

Bracket

Semi-finals

Series drawn. Waterloo Ducks won shoot-out 4–2.

Series drawn. Dragons won shoot-out 4–3.

Third place game

Léopold won both matches and captured third place.

Final

Dragons won both matches and won their 12th national title.

Statistics

Top goalscorers

References

Men's Belgian Hockey League
Belgian Hockey League
Hockey League
Hockey League